Welcome To The Machine is an EP by the UK band Antimatter. It was released on 23 September 2016.

Track listing

Personnel
Welcome To The Machine
Mick Moss – vocals, electric guitar, keyboards, programming
Dave Hall – lead guitar
Jenny O'Connor – additional vocals
Ste Hughes – bass
Liam Edwards – drums

Killer & Redemption
Mick Moss – vocals, electric guitar
Dave Hall – lead guitar, additional vocals
Ste Hughes – bass
Liam Edwards – drums

Technical
'Welcome To The Machine' Recorded July/August 2016 at Wyresdale Studios, Liverpool, Engineered by Mick Moss, Published by Roger-Waters-Music-Overseas-LTD & BMG Rights Management (UK) LTD
'Killer' & 'Redemption' Recorded Live at De Boerderij, Zoetermeer, Netherlands, March 2016, Published by Mandarah Musikverlag
Produced By Daniel Cardoso & Mick Moss 
Mastered by Daniel Cardoso
Photography by Cristel Brouwer
Artwork, Design & Layout by Mick Moss for Music In Stone

References

2012 EPs
Antimatter (band) albums